The Clean and Environmentally Safe Advanced Reactor (CAESAR) is a nuclear reactor concept created by Claudio Filippone, the Director of the Center for Advanced Energy Concepts at the University of Maryland, College Park and head of the ongoing CAESAR Project. The concept's key element is the use of steam as a moderator, making it a type of reduced moderation water reactor. Because the density of steam may be controlled very precisely, Filippone claims it can be used to fine-tune neutron fluxes to ensure that neutrons are moving with an optimal energy profile to split  nuclei – in other words, cause fission.

The CAESAR reactor design exploits the fact that the fission products and daughter isotopes produced via nuclear reactions also decay to produce additional delayed neutrons. Filippone claims that unlike light water-cooled fission reactors, where fission occurring in enriched  fuel rods moderated by liquid-water coolant ultimately creates a Maxwellian thermal neutron flux profile, the neutron energy profile from delayed neutrons varies widely. In a conventional reactor, he theorizes, the moderator slows these neutrons down so that they cannot contribute to the  reaction;  has a comparatively large cross-section for neutrons at high energies.

Filippone maintains that when steam is used as the moderator, the average neutron energy is increased from that of a liquid water-moderated reactor such that the delayed neutrons persist until they hit another nucleus. The resulting extremely high neutron economy, he claims, will make it possible to maintain a self-sustaining reaction in fuel rods of pure , once the reactor has been started by enriched fuel.

Skeptics
Starting in the 1930s Physicists have used the Six factor formula and its derivative Four factor formula to calculate the behavior of nuclear chain reactions inside a mass of fissile material. Based on these calculations even an infinitely large mass of pure U-238 is incapable of sustaining a chain reaction with only its own neutron production, some level of fissile enrichment is always required. It can undergo fission when impacted by an energetic neutron with over 1 MeV of kinetic energy. The energy of delayed neutrons is so low that contribution to  fission is almost 0.0000, requiring some fissile material to keep the reactor safely under prompt criticality: (e.g.  in natural uranium and preferably also some moderator, possibly outside the extra-fast core).

See also 
 Nuclear fission
 Nuclear reactor physics
 Nuclear power
 Nuclear power plant
 Future energy development
 Energy amplifier
 Nuclear waste
 Supercritical water reactor

References

External links 
The Clean And Environmentally Safe Advanced Reactor (CAESAR) Project
Hail, Caesar Economist article
Putting Nuclear Waste to Work Popular Mechanics article from 1998 describing a related reactor design (NPTRE) proposed by Dr. Filippone.
A Second Caesar to Change the Course of History? Article from University of Maryland newsletter.

Nuclear power reactor types
Pseudoscience